Tappan is an unincorporated community in Taylor County, West Virginia, United States.

References 

Unincorporated communities in West Virginia
Unincorporated communities in Taylor County, West Virginia